Charles Adnam Mountfort (9 February 1854–11 May 1941) was a notable New Zealand surveyor. He was born in Christchurch, New Zealand on 9 February 1854.

Mountfort died at Feilding on 11 May 1941, and was buried at Feilding Cemetery.

References

1854 births
1941 deaths
New Zealand surveyors
People from Christchurch
Burials at Feilding Cemetery